Lagarayi is a village in Rajavommangi Mandal, Alluri Sitharama Raju district in the state of Andhra Pradesh in India.

Geography 

Demographics 
 India census, Lagarayi had a population of 1551, out of which 771 were male and 780 were female. The population of children below 6 years of age was 9%. The literacy rate of the village was 63%.

References 

Villages in Rajavommangi mandal